Robert McAuley (24 August 1904 – 1994) was an footballer who played as a fullback. He played professionally in Canada, England, Scotland, Ireland and the United States in addition to earning two caps with the Scottish national team in 1931.

Professional
While born in Scotland, spending his infancy living in Wishaw, Lanarkshire, McAuley's family emigrated to Canada, and he grew up in Montreal, Quebec. At some point, he began playing for Lachine, then moved to Montreal Carsteel, showing on Montreal's roster on 3 August 1925 and again on 1 August 1927, both times as Montreal All-Stars lost the Carls-Rite Cup to Toronto All-Stars. He is also reported as having played for the Grenadier Guards.

In 1925, McAuley moved to the United States and signed with the Providence Clamdiggers of the American Soccer League. He played two and a half seasons in Providence before transferring to the Fall River Marksmen halfway through the 1927–28 season. He remained with the Marksmen until the spring of 1930. That year, Fall River defeated Cleveland Bruell Insurance in the 1930 National Challenge Cup. McAuley scored Fall River's second goal in the Marksmen's 2–1 second game victory.

In July 1930, McAuley signed with Rangers in the Scottish Football League. He made his debut on September 13 of that year, but then returned to Canada and played for Bluebonnets when they won the Quebec Cup at the end of that month. He came back to Rangers and played in two more matches at the end of that 1930–31 season (in which they won the Scottish title) and played regularly in the next, 48 matches including wins in the Glasgow Cup final and in the 1932 Scottish Cup Final, beating Kilmarnock after a replay.

In May 1932, he transferred to Chelsea in the English Football League. He spent over four years with the West London club before moving to Cardiff City in December 1936 for half a season. In 1937, he signed as a player-manager with Sligo Rovers of the League of Ireland. He then moved to Workington A.F.C. for the 1938–1939 season before finishing with Raith Rovers in 1939; he played three times for the Fife club at the start of the 1939–40 season but these were declared void after the outbreak of World War II.

National team
McAuley earned two caps with the Scottish national team, a 3–1 victory over Ireland on 19 September 1931 and a 3–2 victory over Wales on 31 October 1931.

External links
 
 History of Canadian Soccer 1876–1940

References

1904 births
1994 deaths
Date of death missing
Place of death missing
Sportspeople from Wishaw
Association football defenders
Association football player-managers
Canadian soccer players
Soccer players from Montreal
Scottish footballers
Scotland international footballers
Cardiff City F.C. players
Chelsea F.C. players
Fall River Marksmen players
Montreal Carsteel players
Providence Clamdiggers players
Raith Rovers F.C. players
Rangers F.C. players
Sligo Rovers F.C. players
Workington A.F.C. players
Scottish Football League players
League of Ireland players
Sligo Rovers F.C. managers
League of Ireland managers
English Football League players
American Soccer League (1921–1933) players
Scottish football managers
Scottish expatriate footballers
Canadian expatriate soccer players
Expatriate soccer players in the United States
Expatriate association footballers in Ireland
Anglophone Quebec people
Scottish emigrants to Canada
Scottish Football League representative players
Canadian expatriate sportspeople in Scotland
Canadian expatriate sportspeople in England
Canadian expatriate sportspeople in Ireland
Canadian expatriate sportspeople in Wales
Scottish expatriate sportspeople in the United States
Footballers from North Lanarkshire